"Dreamers" is the sixth official single taken from English hip hop duo Rizzle Kicks' debut studio album, Stereo Typical. The single was released in the United Kingdom on 3 August 2012. The track was produced by Ant Whiting. The song features a sample from Nirvana's 1968 single Rainbow Chaser. A music video to accompany the release of "Dreamers" was uploaded to YouTube on 25 July 2012, at a total length of four minutes and forty-two seconds. It was directed and filmed by Toby Lockerbie.  The video features footage of the duo partying on a desert island with a group of friends. Dappy makes a cameo appearance in the video.

An "Epic Remix" of the track was released as part of the single package. It contains additional verses from Pharoahe Monch, Hines (Rizzle's old rap mentor), Professor Green, Ed Sheeran, Foreign Beggars, Dr. Syntax and Chali 2na. This remix premiered on August 1, 2012, via SoundCloud. The "Epic Remix" received its own additional single artwork, which accompanied its premiere.

Track listing

Charts

Release history

References

2012 singles
Rizzle Kicks songs
Song recordings produced by Ant Whiting
Songs written by Ant Whiting
2011 songs